Glendale High School is located in Glendale, Arizona, United States, and is part of the Glendale Union High School District. It was founded in 1911 and is the oldest Arizona high school which still remains on its original site, having been established at Glendale and Grand Avenues in the fall of 1912.

The high school's auditorium is listed on the National Register of Historic Places in Arizona.

Feeder patterns
Schools operated by the Glendale Elementary School District feed into Glendale High School.

Elementary schools that feed into Glendale include:
 Desert Garden Elementary School (K-3)
 Smith Elementary School (K-8)

Middle schools include:
 Challenger Middle School (4-8)
 Don Mensendick Middle School (4-8)

K-8 schools include:
 Desert Spirit
 Glendale American School
 Horizon School
 Imes School
 Landmark School
 Sine School
 Sunset Vista

Notable alumni
 Lerrin LaGrow, Major League Baseball Pitcher
 William G. Bennett, gaming executive
 Marty Robbins, country singer
 Stephen Spinella, actor
 John Williams, pro wrestling
 Kathryn (Wohlwend) Smith, philanthropist

References

Public high schools in Arizona
Schools in Maricopa County, Arizona
Educational institutions established in 1911
1911 establishments in Arizona Territory